The London and North Eastern Railway (LNER) Class O1 was used for two different types of steam locomotive at different times:

 GNR Class O1 (reclassified O3 in 1944)
 LNER Thompson Class O1

O1